The Open Building Research is an Italian company established in 2000 by Paolo Brescia and Tommaso Principi. The company was set up to research into design network, new ways of living with the purpose of blending them within architectural and landscape framework.

Awards
The company has won several world awards for its designs. They include:
Design winner for Ghana's first technology park, Hope City, Accra, Ghana
2012 Green Good Design Award winner for the Milanofiori Housing Complex
Award for the international design competition for Via XX Settembre in Genoa, Italy

References

Architecture firms of Italy